The 1984 United States presidential election in Nebraska took place on November 6, 1984. All 50 states and the District of Columbia, were part of the 1984 United States presidential election. Voters chose five electors to the Electoral College, which selected the president and vice president of the United States.

Nebraska was won by incumbent United States President Ronald Reagan of California, who was running against former Vice President Walter Mondale of Minnesota. Reagan ran for a second time with former C.I.A. Director George H. W. Bush of Texas, and Mondale ran with Representative Geraldine Ferraro of New York, the first major female candidate for the vice presidency.

The presidential election of 1984 was a very partisan election for Nebraska, with over 99% of the electorate voting for either the Democratic or Republican parties, and only five parties formally appearing on the ballot. Reagan won a majority in all of Nebraska's counties, joining previous Republican nominees Theodore Roosevelt in 1904, Warren Harding in 1920, Dwight Eisenhower in 1952, Richard Nixon in 1972, and himself in 1980. 

Nebraska weighed in for this election as 12% more Republican than the national average and with 70.55% of the popular vote, proved to be Reagan's third strongest state in the 1984 election after Utah and Idaho. Reagan won Nebraska by a powerful 42% margin. His 70.55% vote share in the state made it his third-best in the country, after Utah and Idaho. Nebraska continued its trend of voting in line with its sister free-soil and postbellum Great Plains states (North Dakota, South Dakota, and Kansas); the four last disagreed in a presidential election in 1916. 

Reagan did well in population centers and rural areas alike, scoring almost two-thirds of the vote in the state's largest county, Douglas (home to Omaha), and getting over three-quarters of the vote in a majority of Nebraska's counties (58 of 93). Mondale's best county was Saline, at the time the strongest traditional stronghold for the Democratic Party in the state; the county had voted Democratic in every election from 1908 through 1976 save 1920, 1952, 1972, and 1980. Even here, however, Mondale failed to keep Reagan's margin to single digits.

Democratic platform
Walter Mondale accepted the Democratic nomination for presidency after pulling narrowly ahead of Senator Gary Hart of Colorado and Rev. Jesse Jackson of Illinois - his main contenders during what would be a very contentious Democratic primary. During the primary campaign, Mondale was vocal about reduction of government spending, and, in particular, was vocal against heightened military spending on the nuclear arms race against the Soviet Union, which was reaching its peak on both sides in the early 1980s.

Taking a (what was becoming the traditional liberal) stance on the social issues of the day, Mondale advocated for gun control, the right to choose regarding abortion, and strongly opposed the repeal of laws regarding institutionalized prayer in public schools. He also criticized Reagan for what he charged was his economic marginalization of the poor, stating that Reagan's reelection campaign was "a happy talk campaign," not focused on the real issues at hand.

A very significant political move during this election: the Democratic Party nominated Representative Geraldine Ferraro to run with Mondale as Vice-President. Ferraro is the first female candidate to receive such a nomination in United States history. She said in an interview at the 1984 Democratic National Convention that this action "opened a door which will never be closed again," speaking to the role of women in politics.

Republican platform

By 1984, Reagan was very popular with voters across the nation as the President who saw them out of the economic stagflation of the early and middle 1970's, and into a period of (relative) economic stability.

The economic success seen under Reagan was politically accomplished (principally) in two ways. The first was initiation of deep tax cuts for the wealthy, and the second was a wide-spectrum of tax cuts for crude oil production and refinement, namely, with the 1980 Windfall profits tax cuts. These policies were augmented with a call for heightened military spending, the cutting of social welfare programs for the poor, and the increasing of taxes on those making less than $50,000 per year. Collectively called "Reaganomics", these economic policies were established through several pieces of legislation passed between 1980 and 1987.

Some of these new policies also arguably curbed several existing tax loopholes, preferences, and exceptions. Reaganomics has (along with legislation passed under presidents George H. W. Bush and Bill Clinton) been criticized by many analysts as "setting the stage" for economic troubles in the United States after 2007, such as the Great Recession.

Virtually unopposed during the Republican primaries, Reagan ran on a campaign of furthering his economic policies. Reagan vowed to continue his "war on drugs," passing sweeping legislation after the 1984 election in support of mandatory minimum sentences for drug possession.  Furthermore, taking a (what was becoming the traditional conservative) stance on the social issues of the day, Reagan strongly opposed legislation regarding comprehension of gay marriage, abortion, and (to a lesser extent) environmentalism, regarding the final as simply being bad for business.

Results

Results by county

See also
 United States presidential elections in Nebraska
 Presidency of Ronald Reagan

References

Nebraska
1984
1984 Nebraska elections